Devil's Bait is a 1959 black and white British drama film directed by Peter Graham Scott and starring Geoffrey Keen, Jane Hylton and Gordon Jackson. It was a second feature, made for release by the Rank Organisation.

Plot
Joe Frisby calls Dr Mack at the town hall to make another complaint about rats eating his flour. Although the Dr says the council rat catchers are on honeymoon, the telephone exchange girl decides to give Frisby a lead on a cheap rat-catcher. He is put in touch with Mr Love, who has no qualifications whatsoever.

Love improvises on his container for mixing his rat poison by using a loaf tin. Luckily (for the plot) this is very distinctive, with a side split which causes the bread to be mis-shapen. When Mrs Frisby runs out of intact loaf tins she is forced to use the split tin and inadvertently creates a poisoned loaf.

Love drinks his payment and is killed in an accident as he staggers home. He is found by a railway driver the next morning. His landlady tells the police that he was carrying cyanide. The landlady tells the police he used it at Frisby's bakery. However Frisby having found the empty cyanide bottle has already decided this could ruin the bakery and he denies any involvement. Mrs Frisby smells the cyanide in the empty tin and starts trying to call people.

The film then follows the progress of the loaf, the tension being will it be eaten or not.

A baby at a picnic seems the likely victim but a radio announcement alerts his mother and only a duck in the pond is killed by the bread.

Main cast
 Geoffrey Keen as Joe Frisby  
 Jane Hylton as Ellen Frisby  
 Gordon Jackson as Sergeant Malcolm the local policeman
 Dermot Kelly as Mr. Love  
 Shirley Lawrence as Shirley  
 Eileen Moore as Barbara  
 Molly Urquhart as Mrs. Tanner - Love's landlady 
 Noel Hood as Mrs. Evans
 Rupert Davies as Landlord

Production
The film was made at Beaconsfield Studios, Buckinghamshire, England, and on location. A collection of then-and-now location stills and corresponding contemporary photographs is hosted at reelstreets.com.

Critical assessment
Devil's Bait was selected by the film historians Steve Chibnall and Brian McFarlane as one of the 15 most meritorious British B films made between World War II and 1970. They note its narrative command and tension and the way the film moves forward "to a satisfyingly taut end – and one which leaves both narrative and character interests gratified". They particularly praise the two central performances: "The excellent performances of Hylton and Keen create a wholly convincing sense of two people whose relationship is under the strain of everyday irritations and who are imperceptibly drawn closer by the near disaster in which they are caught up."

References

Bibliography
 Chibnall, Steve & Brian McFarlane, The British 'B' Film, Palgrave Macmillan, London, 2009.

External links

1959 films
British drama films
1959 drama films
Films directed by Peter Graham Scott
1950s English-language films
1950s British films